"Living After Midnight" is a song by English heavy metal band Judas Priest. It was originally featured on their 1980 album British Steel, which was their first gold album in the United States selling more than 500,000 copies (and eventually went platinum for selling at least one million). The song speaks to the hedonistic, rebellious spirit of the late 1970s and early 1980s, and is among the band's most popular songs.

Background
The song title came about when Glenn Tipton awakened Rob Halford with his loud guitar playing at 4 AM, during the band's stay at Tittenhurst Park to record British Steel. Halford commented to Tipton that he was "really living after midnight", and Tipton replied that Halford's comment was a great title for the song he was working on.

Video
The music video, directed by Julien Temple and shot live at the Sheffield City Hall, begins with drummer Dave Holland playing an invisible drum kit. During the guitar solo, fans on the front row play along with their cardboard guitars (which were the prominent fan symbols of the new wave of British heavy metal movement).

Reception
PopMatters said, "'Living After Midnight' still sticks in the craws of some fuddy-duddy metal old-timers, but as trite as this little party anthem is, its hook is irresistible and glorious, the sound of a band learning that it never hurts to have a little fun once in a while. The song is oddly clean-cut, hedonism rendered a little innocent, and kind of sweet." BBC agreed it, "epitomised the new breed of radio friendly metal".

In 2012, Loudwire ranked the song number five on its list of the 10 greatest Judas Priest songs, calling it, "Perhaps the greatest Judas Priest song to sing along with," and in 2019, Louder Sound ranked the song number three on its list of the 50 greatest Judas Priest songs.

Cover versions
This song has been covered by The Donnas on their album The Donnas Turn 21 (2001), by Saul Blanch on the tribute album Acero Argentino: Tributo a Judas Priest (2006), by L.A. Guns on Hell Bent Forever: A Tribute to Judas Priest (2008) and by Iron Savior as a bonus track on the Japanese release of their Condition Red (2002) album.

It was covered by Disturbed on the Tribute to British Steel (2010) CD by Metal Hammer UK music magazine, incorporating the opening drum salvo from "Painkiller". It also appears as one of the bonus songs available with some distributions of Asylum (2010), and also features on their B-sides compilation album The Lost Children (2011).

Charts

Personnel
 Rob Halford – vocals
 Glenn Tipton – lead guitar
 K. K. Downing – rhythm guitar
 Ian Hill – bass
 Dave Holland – drums

References

1980 singles
Judas Priest songs
Songs written by Rob Halford
Songs written by Glenn Tipton
Songs written by K. K. Downing
1980 songs
Columbia Records singles
Music videos directed by Julien Temple